The Dodge M37 -ton 4x4 truck (G741) was Dodge's follow-up to their successful WC Series from World War II. Introduced in 1951, it was used extensively by the United States armed forces during the Korean war. In the 1970s, they were replaced by the Commercial Off The Shelf (COTS) based -ton trucks Kaiser M715 (late 1960s), and Dodge's M880/M890 series (1970s).

History 
Six prototypes of the vehicle were produced in early-to-mid 1950 based on the WC series Dodge vehicles used in World War II, with the first pre-production pilot vehicle rolling off the assembly line on 14 December 1950. Many of the components on the M37 are similar or identical to the World War II vehicle and many deficiencies of the previous series were corrected in the M37. Notably, a conventional pickup truck style bed replaced the platform on the World War II vehicle, simplifying production. There was significant drivetrain and powerplant commonality with the WDX series civilian Power Wagons. The M37 shared no sheet metal with the WDX Power Wagon.

Production of the M37 began in earnest in January 1951, with approximately 11,000 vehicles made by the end of that year. By mid-1954 63,000 of the vehicles had been produced. In 1958 a number of modifications to the design resulted in the new vehicles being designated as M37B1. From mid-1958 until the end of production 47,600 M37B1 vehicles were produced. Approximately 4,500 Canadian M37CDNs were also produced between 1951 and 1955. These vehicles continued in service worldwide in the Israeli and Greek militaries.

In total, between 1951 and 1968, some 115,000 Dodge M37s were produced. From 1968 onwards, the U.S. military replaced them with the M-715 family of vehicles, which saw service in the Vietnam War. Although these were higher (1 or five-quarter ton) rated, they were militarized "commercial off-the-shelf" (or 'COTS') trucks – and the Kaiser Jeep M715s were considered underpowered and fragile, compared to the purpose-built Dodge M37 tactical trucks they were built to replace. Starting 1976, the U.S. military went back to Dodges, when the M715s were replaced by the Dodge M880 series, again a -ton militarized COTS truck.

It was common in the 1970 and 1980s to encounter these vehicles in government auctions. Many of the vehicles were transferred to civilian agencies and some are still in use today in rural areas. They were out of significant military service by the late 1970s, replaced by the M715 and M880 series.

Variants

 M42 command truck
 M43 ambulance
 M53 cab-chassis
 M56  tool truck, has a bumper-mounted winch
 MB2 Fire and Rescue Truck (M56 with Gichner body)
 R2 air field rescue truck (w/winch)
 M152 modified enclosed utility truck, Canadian variant
 M201 / V41 telephone maintenance vehicle
 M283 Long Wheel Base (LWB) Cargo Truck
 M506 truck, hydrogen peroxide servicer, PGM-11 Redstone
 V126 truck – for AN/MPX-7 radar
experimental:
 XM142 experimental bomb service truck
 XM152 experimental enclosed utility truck used in small numbers by the USAF
 XM195 experimental lighter, compact version of M37
 XM708 experimental dump truck used mostly by airborne units
 XM711 experimental wrecker truck

Specifications

Engine 
The powerplant was identical to the World War II era WC vehicles line, as was most of the drivetrain. The Chrysler Straight-6 cylinder engine was derived from a 1930s era passenger vehicle engine that was widely produced. This was in line with a long-standing military procurement strategy that attempted to use commercially produced vehicle variants in military service.

Many deficiencies with aging design became apparent in the 1960s, including a tendency of the connecting rods to fail at high rpms due to the long cylinder stroke of the engine. As the average speed of the vehicles in the military increased, these engine failures became commonplace due to the low gear ratio of the vehicle, which was originally designed as a multipurpose vehicle capable of transporting heavy loads of ammunition.

Model: T245 Dodge
Type: "L" Head, 6 cylinder
Power:  at 3200 rpm
Displacement:  (Canadian version used the larger  engine)
Bore: , Stroke: 
Oil capacity: 
Radiator capacity: 
Carter carburetor Model ETW-1 downdraft

Driveline 
Clutch
Borg & Beck Model 11828  single plate dry disc (Borg & Beck 11 inch clutch on Canadian version.)
Transmission
New Process Model 88950 (or NP420)(Acme Model T-98 on Canadian version)
4-speed, Synchro-Shift in 3rd and 4th gear
Transfer Case
New Process 88845 (or NP200)
Ratio: High 1:1, low 1.96:1
Twin lever operation, one for 4×4 or 4×2 selection, one for hi or low range
Drive Shaft
MFG Universal Products
Axles
Dodge Full Floating (hypoid), ratio 5.83:1
Front Universal Drive New Process (Tracta joint)

Chassis 
Fuel tank
 tank (vented through engine air intake for fording purposes)
Electrical
Ignition, starting, lights, 24 volts
Brakes
Wagner hydraulic drum
Parking—external contracting band, 48 square inches (310 cm2)
Steering
Gemmer Model B-60, worm and sector type
Wheelbase
Cargo Model M37 and Command Model M42: 
Ambulance Model M43 and Tele. Maint. Model V41: 
Weight
M37 without winch: , M37 with winch 
Tire Size
9.00 × 16 - 8 ply non-directional military
Winch
Braden LU-4, PTO operated,  capacity (250’ of 7/16" wire rope [75 m by 11 mm] – 10’ [3 m] chain with hook)

Replacement program 
During the late 1960s a competition was initiated by the Army, which requested the leading U.S. automotive companies to submit proposals as a replacement for the M37. Several prototype vehicles passed through the preliminary examination, eventually leading the military to accept General Motors XM705 1-ton Truck and derivative XM737 Ambulance, which were supposed to replace the M37, instead of the militarized COTS M715 series of trucks. However, Congress cut funds for the program, and the XM705 never reached the assembly line.

Below table lists the comparative specifications of the vehicles involved.

Gallery

See also
 Dodge WC series
 G-numbers
 List of Dodge automobiles
 List of U.S. military vehicles by model number
 Weapons of the Salvadoran Civil War

References

External links 

 Dodge M37 Resource - Reinemann, Carl
 Dodge M37 Registry
 M37B1  Ton Gun Truck
 V-126 radar truck

M37
Military trucks of the United States
Pickup trucks
Military vehicles introduced in the 1950s